David Duncombe (1802–1887) was a physician and political figure in Upper Canada.

He was born in New York state in 1802 and came to Upper Canada with his brother Charles. He studied medicine at Fairfield College in New York state and later served as coroner in the Talbot District. He was elected to the Legislative Assembly of Upper Canada to represent Norfolk in 1834 and served until 1841. He was a Reformer but did not participate in the Upper Canada Rebellion.

He died at Waterford in 1887.

References 

1802 births
1887 deaths
19th-century Canadian physicians
Members of the Legislative Assembly of Upper Canada
Canadian coroners